Juan Diego Gutiérrez de la Casas (born 28 April 1992) is a Peruvian professional footballer who plays as a midfielder for Deportivo Garcilaso.

Club career

Universidad San Martín
Gutiérrez made his professional debut in the Torneo Descentralizado on 27 November 2011 in Round 29 of the 2011 season against Cienciano. He was given his debut by former manager Aníbal Ruiz as he was substituted in for Christian Cueva in the 85th minute of the match, which finished in a 2–0 win for his side. He only managed to make that one league appearance and mainly played in the reserve team that season.

The following season, he was promoted to the first team squad by manager Franco Navarro for the start of the 2012 season.
He made his Descentralizado debut that season away to the Inca Garcilaso Stadium against Cienciano and played until the 83rd minute before coming off for Khader Jasaui, as the match eventually finished in a 2–0 loss for his side. In his third match of the season he scored his first league goal in the 1–2 loss at home to Sport Huancayo.

Vejle
On 17 July 2016 it was announced, that Gutiérrez had signed with Danish 1st Division-side Vejle Boldklub.

Sport Boys
On 19 December 2017 Gutiérrez returned to Peru, signing with Peruvian Primera División side Sport Boys.

HFX Wanderers
On 25 February 2019, Gutiérrez signed with Canadian Premier League side HFX Wanderers, joining former Universidad San Martín teammate Luis Alberto Perea for the team's first ever season. On 14 December 2019, the club announced that Gutiérrez would not be returning for the 2020 season.

Oriente Petrolero
On 8 January 2020, Gutiérrez signed with Bolivian Primera División side Oriente Petrolero.

Carlos Stein
In the summer 2020, Gutiérrez returned to Peru, signing for FC Carlos Stein.

Santa Coloma
After a short spell at Unión Comercio, followed by a spell at Sololá in Guatemala, Gutiérrez joined Andorran club FC Santa Coloma in August 2022.

Career statistics

References

External links

1992 births
Living people
Association football midfielders
Peruvian footballers
Footballers from Lima
Peruvian expatriate footballers
Club Deportivo Universidad de San Martín de Porres players
Club Universitario de Deportes footballers
Vejle Boldklub players
Gefle IF players
Sport Boys footballers
Sport Rosario footballers
HFX Wanderers FC players
Oriente Petrolero players
FC Carlos Stein players
Unión Comercio footballers
FC Santa Coloma players
Peruvian Primera División players
Danish 1st Division players
Superettan players
Canadian Premier League players
Bolivian Primera División players
Peruvian expatriate sportspeople in Denmark
Peruvian expatriate sportspeople in Sweden
Peruvian expatriate sportspeople in Canada
Peruvian expatriate sportspeople in Bolivia
Expatriate men's footballers in Denmark
Expatriate footballers in Sweden
Expatriate soccer players in Canada
Expatriate footballers in Bolivia
Expatriate footballers in Guatemala
Expatriate footballers in Andorra
Deportivo Garcilaso players